The 14215 / 14216 Ganga Gomti Express is an Express train belonging to Indian Railways – Northern Railway zone that runs between Prayagraj sangam terminal and Lucknow Junction in India.

It operates as train number 14215 from Prayagraj sangam Terminal to Lucknow NR and as train number 14216 in the reverse direction serving the state of Uttar Pradesh.

Coaches
This train has 1 AC Chair Car, 12 General Unreserved & 2 SLR (Seating cum Luggage Rake) coaches. It does not carry a pantry car.

As is customary with most train services in India, coach composition may be amended at the discretion of Indian Railways depending on demand.

Service

The 14215 Prayag Ghat Terminal–Lucknow Ganga Gomti Express covers the distance of 201 kilometres in 4 hours 3 mins (47.29 km/hr) & in 4 hours 25 mins as 14216 Lucknow–Prayag Ghat Terminal Ganga Gomti Express (45.51 km/hr).

Routeing

The 14215/14216 Ganga Gomti Express runs from Prayag Ghat Terminal via 
],  to Lucknow NR.

Traction

As the entire route is now fully electrified, a Ghaziabad-based WAP-5 / WAP-4 locomotive powers the train for its entire journey.

Timings

 14215 Prayag Ghat Terminal–Lucknow Ganga Gomti Express leaves Prayag Ghat Terminal on a daily basis at 05:50 hrs IST and reaches Lucknow NR at 10:15 hrs IST the same day.
 14216 Lucknow–Prayag Ghat Terminal Ganga Gomti Express leaves Lucknow NR on a daily basis at 18:10 hrs IST and reaches Prayag Ghat Terminal at 22:13 hrs IST the same day.

References 

 https://www.youtube.com/watch?v=VyH-GZGPLrE
 https://www.flickr.com/photos/37330406@N07/5574092252/

External links

Trains from Allahabad
Passenger trains originating from Lucknow
Named passenger trains of India
Express trains in India